CBC2 may be:

 CBC Radio 2, FM radio network in Canada
 CBC-2, a proposed (but never aired) second English-language Canadian TV service that was to be operated by the Canadian Broadcasting Corporation
 Ford Bay Airport, CBC2 ICAO airport code, in the Northwest Territories, Canada